Beverly or Beverley may refer to:

Places

Australia

Beverley, South Australia, a suburb of Adelaide
Beverley, Western Australia, a town
Shire of Beverley, Western Australia

Canada

Beverly, Alberta, a town that amalgamated with the City of Edmonton in 1961
Beverley, Saskatchewan

United Kingdom

Beverley, a market town, and the county town of the East Riding of Yorkshire, England
Beverley railway station
Beverley Beck
Beverley Racecourse
Beverley Rural District
Beverley (UK Parliament constituency)
East Yorkshire Borough of Beverley
Beverley Brook, a minor tributary of the River Thames in south west London

United States

Beverly, Chicago, Illinois, a community area
Beverly, Georgia, an unincorporated community
Beverly, Kansas, a city
Beverly, Kentucky
Beverly, Massachusetts, a city
Beverly Depot (MBTA station)
Beverly, Missouri, an unincorporated community
Beverly, Nebraska, an unincorporated community
Beverly, New Jersey, a city
Beverly, Ohio, a village
Beverly, Washington, an unincorporated community
Beverly, West Virginia, a town
Beverly Creek, a stream in South Dakota
Beverley (West Virginia), a historic farm near Charles Town
Beverly (Pocomoke City, Maryland), a historic home
Beverly (Princess Anne, Maryland), a historic home

Music
 Beverly (band), a Brooklyn-based indie band
 Beverley Sisters, a British singing trio of the 1950s and 1960s
 Beverly (singer), a Filipino born Japanese singer

Other uses
Beverly (catamaran), an American catamaran that won various events in the early 1960s
Beverly (drink), an apéritif made by Coca-Cola in Italy
Beverly (mango), a mango cultivar
Beverly (name), including a list of people and fictional characters with the given name or surname
Beverly the Bug, the first known opal with an insect inclusion
Beverly Garden, a public housing estate in Tseung Kwan O, Hong Kong
Blackburn Beverley, a 1950s British heavy transport aircraft

See also 
The Beverly Center, a monolithic shopping center in Los Angeles, California
Beverly Hills (disambiguation)
Edmonton Beverly-Clareview, Alberta, Canada, provincial electoral district
Beverly Heights, Edmonton, Alberta, Canada, a neighbourhood
Lower Beverley Lake, Ontario, Canada